Elina Svitolina was the defending champion, having won the event in 2012, but she decided to participate at the 2013 Toray Pan Pacific Open instead.

Alexandra Panova won the title, defeating Victoria Kan in the final, 7–5, 6–1.

Seeds

Main draw

Finals

Top half

Bottom half

References 
 Main draw

Telavi Open - Singles
2013 in Georgian sport
Telavi Open